An artisanal miner or small-scale miner (ASM) is a subsistence miner who is not officially employed by a mining company, but works independently, mining minerals using their own resources, usually by hand.

Small-scale mining includes enterprises or individuals that employ workers for mining, but generally still using manually-intensive methods, working with hand tools.

Artisanal miners often undertake the activity of mining seasonally – for example crops are planted in the rainy season, and mining is pursued in the dry season. However, they also frequently travel to mining areas and work year-round. There are four broad types of ASM: permanent artisanal mining, seasonal (annually migrating during idle agriculture periods), rush-type (massive migration, pulled often by commodity price jumps), and shock-push (poverty-drive, following conflict or natural disasters).

ASM is an important socio-economic sector for the rural poor in many developing nations, many of whom have few other options for supporting their families. Over 90% of the world's mining workforce are ASM. There are an estimated 40.5 million men, women and children directly engaged in ASM, from over 80 countries in the global south. 20% of the global gold supply is produced by the ASM sector, as well as 80% of the global gemstone and 20% of global diamond supply, and 25% of global tin production. More than 150 million depend on ASM for their livelihood. 70 - 80% of small-scale miners are informal, and approximately 30% are women, although this ranges in certain countries and commodities from 5% to 80%.

Issues
Artisanal mining can include activities as simple as panning for gold in rivers, to as complex as development of underground workings and small-scale processing plants.  In any of these circumstances, issues can stem from difficulties in achieving regulatory oversight of a large number of small operations (including issues such as security of land tenure for artisanal miners, to enforcement of environment, safety standards, and labour standards).

As a result, child labour and a large number of fatal accidents have been reported in artisanal mines (especially coal mines, gold mines, stone mines). To improve the situation of small-scale miners, organising them in cooperatives and certifying gold may be helpful.

Globally, artisanal mining contributes 17% - 20%, or between 380 - 450 tonnes of annual gold production.  This gold input is equally a significant contribution to both the international gold industry and the economy for a given community. The 400% rise in the price of gold from 2002 (US $274/oz) to 2012 (US $1,230/oz) appears to be reflected as an increasing number of miners undertaking this occupation.

An increase in demand for lithium-ion battery-powered products has led to increased demand for cobalt. As a result, there has been a boom in artisanal mining for the mineral with an estimated 150,000-200,000 artisanal miners currently working in mines in the Democratic Republic of the Congo. Due to the risks of mining cobalt, many of these miners serious injury or death with an estimated 2,000 miners dying each year in the DRC alone.

Formalization 
In order to maximize the positive impact of ASM, it must be formalized, responsible and well-governed. The majority of miners worldwide do not have legal title, and oftentimes the regulatory frameworks for national mining policy work to exclude or restrict ASM practices. Mineral rights for ASM are required, including the right to transfer and upgrade mineral concessions, rights to successive permit renewals and exclusivity, access to land for exploration, extraction and processing, access to markets and access to government agencies to support a responsible ASM legal environment.

Gender 
Globally, an average of 30% of ASM are women. While this is a much higher percentage than the large-scale mining (LSM) sector, where less than 10% of mining employees are female, there are many challenges facing women in ASM. Digging, crushing ore, and other extraction tasks are exhausting dangerous work, and yet as the primary livelihood for millions of women, they continue to go to mining sites even while pregnant and nursing young children. Women have reduced access to mining resources, including land, finance, and tools. Women in mining networks have slowly grown over the years, but much remains to support them. Empowering women, building solidarity, and supporting national associations will ensure that rights are respected and women gain better opportunities and access to improving livelihoods.

Development minerals 
Development minerals are "minerals and materials that are mined, processed, manufactured and used domestically in industries such as construction, manufacturing, and agriculture".

Data sharing 
Data on ASM is woefully inadequate, which limits an understanding of the sector, and appropriate policy measures. Collaborative and transparent knowledge sharing, data collection and analysis is required. Governments, research and training institutions, the private sector, consultants, and civil society should contribute to open databases, integrate ASM into national census and surveys, and provide for improved policy and transparency.

The DELVE database project is establishing a global platform for ASM data. DELVE's vision is "a world in which artisanal and small-scale mining is recognized as an important contributor to global development". The platform collects, analyzes and shares data using open-source principles, which informs policy-making and interventions, and ultimately improves miners' lives. An annual ASM State of the Sector review summarizes what is known about the sector, including its scale, impact, and cost.

Inclusive finance 
ASM lack access to affordable and tailored financial products, which leads to stagnation, eventual abandonment of ASM business ventures, and contributes to the ASM poverty cycle. Improving access to markets and financial products tailored to ASM including credit guarantees and private and public loan facilities, is critical to improving the sector's impact, resilience and sustainability.

Health and safety 
ASM present a wide range of physical hazards to workers including the use of hazardous materials (ex: mercury, cyanide), poorly constructed pits/shafts/tunnels prone to collapses/landslides/flooding/lack of ventilation, poor waste management leading to water contamination and diseases, lack of PPE (personal protective equipment) or training in proper use leading to silicosis and other health risks, impacts related to dust/noise/exhaustive labour, lack of potable water/latrines/sanitation facilities leading to gastrointestinal and other diseases, and physical risks from inappropriate use and maintenance of mechanical equipment. Improving monitoring and reporting on occupational health and safety is an important first step, as well as training on standards and skills.

A recent project of the tin working group of IDH addressed these challenges in the Indonesian tin ASM sector. Key results included sector dialogue and alignment, improved regulatory framework, awareness-raising to improve supply chain practices and training guidelines for more responsible ASM techniques.

Child labour 
Child labour is pervasive across many ASM contexts, and integrated approaches are needed to target its root causes. Due to its hazardous nature to children's safety, health (physical and mental) and moral development, mining is considered one of the "worst forms" of child labour as defined by the ILO. There are at least one million child miners across the world, although the number is probably much higher due to the difficulty of collecting data.

Pact's Watoto Inje ya Mungoti (Children out of Mining) project in the Democratic Republic of Congo has helped to achieve a more than 90% reduction in child labor at targeted mines, using novel approaches including various community governance committees, awareness-raising and positive parenting skills training, peer exchanges, traditional song and dance, sport, children's interactive forums and traditional signage and radio media strategies.

Terre des Hommes works on addressing child labour in the mica mines in Madagascar.

Environmental issues 
Due to the inherent digging of soil and sluicing involved in artisanal mining, water siltation, erosion, and soil degradation can be an issue in rivers used for mining. Rivers are also commonly diverted as a way to access mineral rich riverbeds. The digging of mines can also dig up and spread harmful materials, such as lead, that are located within the soil.

The conservation of forests is also a great concern as many artisanal mining operations take place in and around forests that are home to vast amounts of biodiversity. One assessment indicates that almost three-quarters of active mining and exploratory sites overlap with areas of high conservation value and high watershed stress. It has also been reported that some mining operations also work within environmental protected areas. Artisanal mining operations often cut down trees to clear space for their camps, and it is common for miners to hunt, fish, and collect other forest resources for food and medicine, or as a way to supplement their income.

Mercury and other dangerous chemicals, such as cyanide, are commonly used in artisanal gold mining. Mercury is used during the amalgamation process as a cheap way to collect small gold particles from sediment. Once mercury and gold are combined to create amalgam, the amalgam is typically burned with a blowtorch or over an open flame to separate the mercury from the gold. Since gold mines are almost always set up near rivers, often excess chemicals are distributed directly into waterways. Once it becomes imbedded in soil or water, mercury becomes methylmercury that can easily accumulate in fish, which not only harms the fish but all other animals, including humans, who eat fish. According to the U.S. Environmental Protection Agency, the observed effects on animals exposed to high levels of methylmercury include mortality, reduced fertility, slower growth rates, and abnormal behavior that affects survival. Artisanal mining has been accused of being a major contributor to environmental degradation and pollution.

Violence 
Artisanal mining has attracted a large number of Chinese migrant workers to Africa. In 2013, widespread conflict and violence between illegal Chinese artisanal mine workers and Ghanaian natives were reported. Ghana officials claimed tens of thousands of Chinese immigrants were working in illegal artisanal gold mines, damaging land, polluting drinking water, and destroying agricultural lands. This triggered violence and armed attacks between Chinese groups and local Ghanaian villagers, causing widespread unrest and deaths. By July 2013, Ghana had deported over 4,000 Chinese citizens working illegally in artisanal mines.

Opportunities

ASGM, if properly regulated, has the capacity to lift people out of poverty, improve health and environmental conditions, and create better economic conditions for entire regions. The sector provides effective poverty relief by providing jobs, ensuring profits for small producers, and transferring wealth from rich to poor countries. Many poor populations in rural areas of the developing world mainly participate in low productivity employment in the agricultural and services sectors. ASM supplements these livelihoods and creates jobs in some of the poorest places in the world.

Although there are large industrial mines worldwide, artisanal mines employ about ten times as many people, typically workers who are not eligible for employment in industrial mining due to a lack of formal education and experience. Furthermore, small miners’ earnings tend to be spent locally or sent as remittances to other poor communities, supporting sustainable economic growth in local communities. Bringing ASGM into the formal economy through legalization benefits governments in that they reduce illicit financial transactions, collect taxes, and often see a subsequent reduction in crime in these regions. ASGM is recognized by the world’s major development organizations such as the UN, World Bank, and Global Environment Facility to have the potential to be a major driver for rural development, improving lives in large, rural areas.

Approaches to supporting and formalizing artisanal mining

Although there are many widespread problems with ASGM, through various levels of support the ASGM sector can be improved and its potential harnessed. For example, Global Affairs Canada is financing projects to help miners obtain better technology and to employ better environmental and social practices. This equipment and accompanying training decreases and ultimately eliminates the use of mercury, and often increases the gold yield for miners.

Organizations

Pact Mines to Markets (M2M)

Pact is a nonprofit international development organization founded in 1971, working on the ground in nearly 40 countries to improve the lives of those who are challenged by poverty and marginalization. Pact's Mines to Markets program (M2M) uses an integrated, holistic approach to help resource-dependent communities improve their lives. Specializing in areas including health and safety in mining, human rights, traceability and transparency, economic empowerment among miners, mercury abatement, child labor reduction, mineral certification and ethical sourcing, it helps communities gain lasting benefit from natural resources by using them more sustainably. It also improves governance in the countries where it works, strengthening local, regional and national institutions.

M2M programs currently operate in 12 countries, 10 of which are in Africa.

The Artisanal Gold Council 

The Artisanal Gold Council, based in Victoria, British Columbia, is a not-for-profit organisation dedicated to improving the opportunities, environment and health of the millions of people involved in the artisanal gold mining sector in over 80 countries worldwide. It is focused on professionalizing the sector so it can adopt socially responsible and environmentally sound methods of mining and gold processing. There is a focus on professionalization because it drives many improvements including allowing more wealth to be generated, and more of the wealth to be captured at the local level and re-invested in the development of its people and their needs. The council accomplishes this through four main approaches: teaching and delivering improved practices to miners in the field; working with governments to creating enabling policy frameworks that support the development of artisanal miners; creating sustainable markets and sustainable finance mechanisms for artisanal miners and their products; and creating and sharing knowledge about the sector (R&D and outreach). At field sites, by focusing on methodologies that forego the use of mercury and other toxic chemicals, the council helps miners and their communities to work and live in a safer and healthier environment, and responsibly produce gold. Under those conditions, the sector can play a vital role in relieving poverty, generating inclusive and sustainable economic growth, and creating full and productive employment and decent work. The Artisanal Gold Council has experience in more than 25 countries and currently (2018) has active projects in 12 countries: Peru, Mongolia, Myanmar, Indonesia, Lao, Burkina Faso, Mali, Senegal, Gabon, Ecuador, Papua New Guinea, the Philippines, and Mozambique. An important current focus is to help countries fulfill their obligations under the Minamata Convention on Mercury (to eliminate the use of mercury by the artisanal mining sector) by working with governments to develop National Action Plans (NAPs) and to pilot concrete field models that can be replicated to greater and greater numbers of artisanal mining communities.

The Alliance for Responsible Mining
The Alliance for Responsible Mining (ARM) is an independent, mission-driven initiative that supports artisanal and small-scale (ASM) miners globally. Established in 2004, the organization’s mission is to enhance social and economic wellbeing, strengthen environmental protection and establish fair governance in ASM communities by formalizing the ASM sector. To achieve its mission, ARM has created an exceptional set of social and environmental standards known as the Fairmined certification. ARM offers extensive and continuous support and training to ASM communities to help them reach the standards, achieve the Fairmined certification and invest in community development. Furthermore, ARM serves as an intermediary for ASM communities, which gives them the opportunity to respond to international markets demanding ethical metals and jewelry. Since 2004, ARM has facilitated the positive transformation of multiple ASM communities in Latin America and is currently expanding its efforts to Africa and Asia.

Collaborative group on Artisanal and Small-Scale Mining (CASM)
CASM is a global networking and coordination facility with a stated mission "to reduce poverty by improving the environmental, social and economic performance of artisanal and small-scale mining in developing countries." CASM is currently chaired by the UK's Department for International Development and is housed at the World Bank headquarters in Washington, D.C.

Resourced by a multi-donor trust fund, CASM currently receives its core funding from the UK and the World Bank, supplemented by program support from Japan, amongst others, Canada, France and the US. Several companies, trade associations and charitable funds, such as Tiffany & Co Foundation, also contribute finances to CASM's work program. CASM funding has leveraged significant additional funding for work in the ASM sector.

In 2008, CASM produced a report on Mineral Certification. This report discussed the opportunity of using certification of origin and certification of ethical quality to stimulate sustainable development in artisanal mining communities.

International Program on the Elimination of Child Labour
The International Programme on the Elimination of Child Labour, a program of the International Labour Organization (ILO), includes a sector of activity in "Mining and Quarrying".  It notes that child labour "can still be seen in small-scale mines of Asia, Africa, Latin America, and even parts of Europe".  The program approach focuses particularly on the development of a solid knowledge base and assessment, and working with partners for delivery of programs.

ICMM "Working Together" 
A significant issue in artisanal and small-scale arises when larger mining companies gain rights to develop deposits that are currently worked by artisanal minings.  The International Council on Mining and Metals (ICMM) has produced a guidance note for companies engaging with the artisanal and small-scale mining (ASM) sector.  As is noted in the introduction to this document "The fact that much of ASM activity occurs outside regulatory frameworks – whether illegal or not – can also present significant challenges for companies and regulators. There can be significant tension between ASM miners and their own governments – with companies caught in the middle."

The guidance document, which is put forward as a pilot was produced in partnership with Communities and Small-Scale Mining, the International Finance Corporation’s Oil, Gas, and Mining Sustainable Community Development Fund and ICMM.

ASM 
In September 2018, over 500 delegates from more than 70 countries gathered in Livingstone, Zambia for the International Conference on Artisanal and Small-Scale Mining and Quarrying. The enormous potential of the sector was discussed in 36 workshops, highlighting ASM's ability to reduce poverty, interlock with agricultural livelihoods, and stimulate jobs, markets and wealth creation in rural communities, as well as national economic growth through taxation and exports of raw and value-added minerals. A key output was the signing of the Mosi-oa-Tunya Declaration on ASM and Quarrying, which reaffirms the central role of ASM for "enhanced livelihoods, employment creation, poverty reduction and sustainable development". As one delegate said of the conference: "Making these visions a reality will take time, and much change still needs to happen at all levels of governance in the process of formalization. But with the voices of artisanal and small-scale miners finally engaged in international policy dialogues, and especially those of women, there is hope that in five years' time, a formalized, government-supported and socially, economically and environmentally productive ASM sector will have started to emerge."

Country specific

Ghana

In Ghana, the regulation of artisanal gold mining is set forth in the Small-Scale Gold Mining Law, 1989 (PNDCL 218). The Precious Minerals Marketing Corporation Law, 1989 (PNDCL 219), set up the Precious Minerals Marketing Corporation (PMMC) to promote the development of small-scale gold and diamond mining in Ghana and to purchase the output of such mining, either directly or through licensed buyers.

Peru
Peru's government passed legislation in 2002 which aimed to formalize and promote artisanal gold mining activity, seen as a "great source of employment and collateral benefits". Despite this legislative commitment, the complexities involved in formalization efforts have seen subsequent governments shy away from such initiatives. Authorities charged with implementing the legislation and regulating the activity, lack the finance and personnel necessary to carry out such tasks effectively. La Rinconada, Peru, highest elevation human habitation in the world, in the Andes on the border with Bolivia, is one site of extensive artisanal mining.

Philippines

According to the International Labour Organization small-scale or artisanal gold mining accounts for as much as 80 per cent of gold production in the Philippines. As of 2017, artisanal mines are estimated to employ around 350,000 workers, of which 18,000 are women and children. Compressor mining, a hazardous mining method where ore is extracted by divers in flooded, narrow shafts while breathing through an air tube connected to makeshift compressor, was banned in the Philippines in 2012. Enforcement is however lax and this mining extraction method remains prevalent in the province of Camarines Norte notably around the towns of Santa Milagrosa and Paracale.

South Africa
As the price of gold grew on international markets, formal large-scale mining in South Africa shed jobs, while labour unrest and strikes led to increasing layoffs of mine workers on the large mines. South Africa has some of the deepest and largest gold mines in the world, with some of the largest deposits of gold, platinum, diamonds and other precious metals, precious stones and dimension stone. 'try-try', meaning 'try and try again' or 'don't give up').

According to the Mineral and Petroleum Resources Development Act of 2002, only large, fully registered, capital intensive industry may prospect for, mine and process minerals.  The South African government is the legal owner or 'custodian' of all underground resources irrespective of land rights or title on the land surface. While any small scale and artisanal miners are, by definition, illegal, all natural resources covered by the act are deemed to be "the common heritage of all the people of South Africa". This provision gives many illegal miners the justification they need, and that they feel is important, to mine these resources for their own account, regardless of the other provisions of the Act.

Only some minerals, such as gold and diamonds, can be mined in an artisanal fashion. Gold and diamonds exist in shallow surface deposits in South Africa, as well as in deep deposits.  For instance, Tau Tona gold mine to the west of Johannesburg, extends  underground, but at the same time, artisanal miners are still exploiting near-surface deposits ranging from only a few meters to  underground in the same area.

Outside of the large formal mines, artisanal mining takes two forms. The overall pool of miners, that is, of men who identify as miners and wish to work in mining, includes many who are partially employed, employed by labour brokers, outsourced workers, and other part-time or unemployed miners who often live in informal settlements around the large mines.

Artisanal miners are of three kinds: 'illegal' miners, artisanal miners, and peripheral or part-time miners who may shift back and forth from between formal, illegal, and artisanal mining work.

They compete with formally employed legal mine labour in large underground mines for gold. The  may live underground for many weeks, while collecting sufficient quantities of high grade ore for further processing. They are often miners who have been trained in formal mining techniques, but then laid off. They resort to illegal mining in order to continue to utilise their skills. Their social networks with other formally employed miners help them to obtain access to underground mine workings.

Other miners are properly artisanal, opening adits and driving shafts and tunnels using hand tools such as hammers, chisels and spades.  They train each other and typically have little or no formal mining experience.

The nature of gold deposits helps to determine the type of artisanal mining.  On the Witwatersrand reef, gold is found in the form of very fine particles in hard-rock sedimentary conglomerate rock in steeply inclined deposits.  to the west of Johannesburg and the Witwatersrand reef (the ridge that contains the gold), the mines around Barberton contain visible nugget gold in quartz veins, in addition to fine particles, that are embedded in metamorphosed late Archaean age rocks dating to 3.2 to 3.4 billion years ago. These different formations require different artisanal and formal mining methods, with different social and economic structures.

For instance, the deep mines of Johannesburg are capital intensive and deep, while the associated artisanal mining is shallow and relatively unprofitable.  Artisanal miners usually operate as teams that carry the process through from underground mining and sorting the ore, to production of the finished gold for sale. Artisanal mining in the Barberton region produces relatively large nuggets in reasonably profitable mining ventures. Formal mines, such as Agnes, Fairview, Consort, and Barbrook, are relative small, and artisanal mining is growing in the region.

Since artisanal mining is illegal in South Africa, it is difficult to estimate its economic value.  In gold-bearing regions such as Roodeport and Barberton, specialised settlements and organisations have emerged recently (since 2007).

Artisanal mining in South Africa probably has a long history, but this has not been documented.  For Zimbabwe, Roger Summers has mapped extensive pre-colonial mines, prospecting trenches, and early processing sites, but this has so far not been done for South Africa.

Violence is a constant problem in the artisanal mining sector.  This is often caused by conflict between miners and police and private security personnel, and between different groups of miners competing for resources.  However, there is also a remarkable degree of mutual respect among the miners, especially in the face of the dangers presented by conflict above ground, and the danger of work underground. Typically, artisanal miners are young males, but there are occasional female underground workers.  Women and children are often involved in sorting and pulverising the ore above ground, and in transporting food, materials, and other logistic support.

Gold ore is processed informally using simple technologies. Ore is first crushed by hand on open rock surface and hammerstones. This work is often done by women and children.  The pulverised ore is concentrated using visual sorting, sieving, gold panning,  and by washing on riffle tables made of plastic sheets on heaps of sand. Final gold extraction is accomplished using mercury amalgamation. Mercury is typically burned off using an oxy-gas torch.  The gold is sold to local agents, or may be exported directly to major markets for raw gold including India, China, Israel and Lebanon.  Gold is also taken across borders into Zimbabwe and Botswana where legislation makes it easier to sell the gold to small refineries and small mining operations, where it may be incorporated into their own output for reporting purposes.

Artisanal mining in South Africa appears to be increasing despite the legal and practical difficulties.

See also

 Bootleg mining
 Ninja miner
Illegal mining

References

Further reading
"The Dark Side of Congo’s Cobalt Rush", The New Yorker
"The Real Price of Gold", National Geographic

Traditional mining